Paški baškotin is an aromatic zwieback rusk bread from the island of Pag of Croatia.

References

Breads
Croatian cuisine
Pag (island)